WTS is an acronym for:

Military
 War Training Service, formerly known as the Civilian Pilot Training Program
 Women's Transport Service, part of the First Aid Nursing Yeomanry
 , a museum collection of historical technological defence systems

Places
 Wall Township Speedway, a former speedway in Wall Township, New Jersey
 Wong Tai Sin, Hong Kong
 Wong Tai Sin station, MTR station code

Other
 William Tecumseh Sherman, American Civil War general
 Want to show, a frequently used phrase in mathematics
 The Watchtower Society (aka Watch Tower Bible and Tract Society of Pennsylvania), the primary corporation for administration of Jehovah's Witnesses' activities worldwide
 , a transport social network
 Westminster Theological Seminary, a Christian graduate institution
 WTS Group, an international consulting group with tax, legal and consulting business units
 World Tour Soccer, a game released on the PS2 PSP and Xbox
 ITU World Triathlon Series, the International Triathlon Union's annual series of triathlon events
 Women's Transportation Seminar, a women's organization for transportation professionals; see 100 years of women in transport campaign
 WT: Social, a social media platform founded in October 2019 by Jimmy Wales, creator of Wikipedia